The team relay competition at the 2023 FIL European Luge Championships was held on 15 January 2023.

Results
The event was started at 13:48.

References

Team relay